Hendrik Joseph Daniller (born 5 April 1984) is a South African rugby union footballer who most recently played as a fullback for the .

Career

He moved south to join the Boland Cavaliers in 2006 and helped them earn promotion to the Currie Cup Premier Division in his first season.

Impressive displays in Wellington earned him a move to the Cheetahs. However, he has since become a dependable player for the Cheetahs and currently boasts a combined total of over 130 caps in all competitions.

In May 2014, it was announced that Daniller would move to Italian Pro12 side Zebre for the 2014–15 Pro12 season.

International

Daniller represented South Africa Under 19 in the 2003 IRB Under 19 World Championship and South Africa Under 21 in the 2004 and 2005 IRB Under 21 World Championships.

References

Living people
1984 births
South African rugby union players
Cheetahs (rugby union) players
Free State Cheetahs players
Bulls (rugby union) players
Blue Bulls players
Boland Cavaliers players
Griffons (rugby union) players
Rugby union players from Cape Town
Afrikaner people
Rugby union fullbacks
Alumni of Paarl Gimnasium
Zebre Parma players
South African expatriate rugby union players
South African expatriate sportspeople in Italy
Expatriate rugby union players in Italy